"Follow one's nose" is a metaphoric idiom in English. It may refer to:

 Following one's intuition, especially in an investigation or other research
 More literally, to use one's sense of smell, to locate the source of an odor
 For an animal with keen smell, such as a scent hound, to do so (e.g. to track prey in the wild; or, in service to humans, for hunters' game tracking, drug detection for police, and search and rescue operations)
 Nose-following, a mathematics publishing and pedagogical term meaning to pursue a mathematical solution by mechanistically applying one's already-understood concepts without learning or applying anything new